The A.G. Gaston Motel is a historic motel in Birmingham, Alabama. Built in 1954 by local businessman A. G. Gaston, it served as premium accommodation for African American travelers. The Southern Christian Leadership Conference used Room 30 as its headquarters for leaders Dr. Martin Luther King, Jr., Ralph D. Abernathy, Fred L. Shuttlesworth, and others to plan portions of the 1963 Birmingham campaign of the civil rights movement. On May 10, 1963, the motel was bombed by white supremacist terrorists. After discrimination in public accommodation was outlawed, the motel's business declined, and it was used as senior housing from 1982 to 1996. It is now part of the Birmingham Civil Rights National Monument established in 2017, co-owned by the National Park Service and City of Birmingham. It has been designated by the National Trust for Historic Preservation as one of America's National Treasures.

See also
 List of national monuments of the United States

Bibliography 
 Marie A. Sutton, The A.G. Gaston Motel in Birmingham: A Civil Rights Landmark, Arcadia Publishing, 2014.

References

External links 

 A.G. Gaston Motel on the National Park Service website.
 A.G. Gaston Motel on the National Trust for Historic Preservation website.

Motels in the United States
Buildings and structures in Birmingham, Alabama
Civil rights movement